Roberto Colín Gamboa (born 27 September 1956) is a Mexican politician affiliated with the National Action Party. As of 2014 he served as Deputy of the LIX Legislature of the Mexican Congress representing the Federal District.

References

1956 births
Living people
Politicians from Mexico City
Members of the Chamber of Deputies (Mexico)
National Action Party (Mexico) politicians
Instituto Politécnico Nacional alumni
21st-century Mexican politicians